The 1957 Pittsburgh Pirates season was the 76th season of the Pittsburgh Pirates franchise; the 71st in the National League. The Pirates finished tied with the Chicago Cubs for eighth and last in the league standings with a record of 62–92.

The first season to be broadcast on television, the games were aired on KDKA-TV, making them the last of the original MLB teams to debut television broadcasts of its home and away games.

Regular season 
The Pittsburgh Pirates played the Brooklyn Dodgers in the final game at Ebbets Field. The game was contested on September 24, 1957, and Brooklyn pitcher Danny McDevitt pitched a complete game shutout, winning 2-0. He had nine strikeouts while allowing just five hits.

Season standings

Record vs. opponents

Game log

|- bgcolor="ccffcc"
| 1 || April 16 || Giants || 9–2 || Friend (1–0) || Antonelli || — || 33,405 || 1–0
|- bgcolor="ffbbbb"
| 2 || April 18 || @ Dodgers || 1–6 || Maglie || Arroyo (0–1) || — || 11,202 || 1–1
|- bgcolor="ffbbbb"
| 3 || April 20 || @ Dodgers || 0–2 || Podres || Friend (1–1) || — || 11,083 || 1–2
|- bgcolor="ccffcc"
| 4 || April 21 || @ Dodgers || 6–3 || Purkey (1–0) || Newcombe || Face (1) ||  || 2–2
|- bgcolor="ffbbbb"
| 5 || April 21 || @ Dodgers || 4–7 || Drysdale || Kline (0–1) || Labine || 19,635 || 2–3
|- bgcolor="ffbbbb"
| 6 || April 22 || @ Giants || 1–3 || Gomez || Arroyo (0–2) || — || 5,403 || 2–4
|- bgcolor="ffbbbb"
| 7 || April 23 || @ Giants || 0–1 || Burnside || Kline (0–2) || — || 3,445 || 2–5
|- bgcolor="ffbbbb"
| 8 || April 24 || @ Phillies || 5–8 || Simmons || Friend (1–2) || Miller || 15,849 || 2–6
|- bgcolor="ccffcc"
| 9 || April 26 || Dodgers || 7–1 || Purkey (2–0) || Podres || — || 26,918 || 3–6
|- bgcolor="ffbbbb"
| 10 || April 27 || Dodgers || 2–6 || Newcombe || Kline (0–3) || — || 12,926 || 3–7
|- bgcolor="ccffcc"
| 11 || April 28 || Dodgers || 3–0 || Friend (2–2) || Craig || — || 17,317 || 4–7
|- bgcolor="ffbbbb"
| 12 || April 30 || Cardinals || 5–6 (13) || Jackson || Face (0–1) || — || 19,291 || 4–8
|-

|- bgcolor="ffbbbb"
| 13 || May 1 || Cardinals || 2–9 || Schmidt || Purkey (2–1) || Smith || 4,919 || 4–9
|- bgcolor="ffbbbb"
| 14 || May 2 || Braves || 5–8 (10) || Burdette || Face (0–2) || Murff || 14,131 || 4–10
|- bgcolor="ffbbbb"
| 15 || May 3 || Braves || 7–8 (11) || Murff || Face (0–3) || Spahn || 16,621 || 4–11
|- bgcolor="ccffcc"
| 16 || May 4 || Braves || 1–0 || Law (1–0) || Pizarro || — || 6,398 || 5–11
|- bgcolor="ffbbbb"
| 17 || May 5 || Redlegs || 2–6 || Lawrence || Arroyo (0–3) || — ||  || 5–12
|- bgcolor="ffbbbb"
| 18 || May 5 || Redlegs || 3–7 || Gross || Purkey (2–2) || — || 23,629 || 5–13
|- bgcolor="ffbbbb"
| 19 || May 7 || Cubs || 8–10 (14) || Lown || Pepper (0–1) || Collum || 9,957 || 5–14
|- bgcolor="ffbbbb"
| 20 || May 8 || Cubs || 1–7 || Drott || Law (1–1) || — || 7,896 || 5–15
|- bgcolor="ffbbbb"
| 21 || May 10 || Phillies || 1–3 || Sanford || Kline (0–4) || — || 10,027 || 5–16
|- bgcolor="ffbbbb"
| 22 || May 11 || Phillies || 2–7 || Haddix || Friend (2–3) || — || 4,994 || 5–17
|- bgcolor="ffbbbb"
| 23 || May 12 || Phillies || 2–6 || Simmons || Arroyo (0–4) || Miller ||  || 5–18
|- bgcolor="ccffcc"
| 24 || May 12 || Phillies || 6–1 || Law (2–1) || Roberts || — || 10,457 || 6–18
|- bgcolor="ccffcc"
| 25 || May 14 || @ Cubs || 8–6 || Arroyo (1–4) || Drott || Face (2) || 2,478 || 7–18
|- bgcolor="ccffcc"
| 26 || May 16 || @ Braves || 2–1 || Friend (3–3) || Pizarro || — || 15,622 || 8–18
|- bgcolor="ffbbbb"
| 27 || May 18 || @ Braves || 5–6 || Burdette || Smith (0–1) || — || 18,850 || 8–19
|- bgcolor="ffbbbb"
| 28 || May 19 || @ Redlegs || 7–8 || Acker || Purkey (2–3) || — ||  || 8–20
|- bgcolor="ffbbbb"
| 29 || May 19 || @ Redlegs || 4–5 || Acker || Kline (0–5) || — || 24,564 || 8–21
|- bgcolor="ffbbbb"
| 30 || May 24 || @ Phillies || 3–7 || Sanford || Friend (3–4) || Farrell || 17,340 || 8–22
|- bgcolor="ffbbbb"
| 31 || May 25 || @ Phillies || 6–8 || Haddix || Kline (0–6) || Farrell || 6,445 || 8–23
|- bgcolor="ccffcc"
| 32 || May 26 || @ Phillies || 13–5 || Face (1–3) || Simmons || — ||  || 9–23
|- bgcolor="ffbbbb"
| 33 || May 26 || @ Phillies || 3–6 || Cardwell || Arroyo (1–5) || — || 13,557 || 9–24
|- bgcolor="ccffcc"
| 34 || May 28 || Dodgers || 3–2 (11) || Face (2–3) || Newcombe || — || 13,259 || 10–24
|- bgcolor="ffbbbb"
| 35 || May 29 || Dodgers || 0–1 || Podres || Kline (0–7) || — || 3,610 || 10–25
|- bgcolor="ffbbbb"
| 36 || May 30 || Dodgers || 3–4 || Maglie || Law (2–2) || Labine ||  || 10–26
|- bgcolor="ccffcc"
| 37 || May 30 || Dodgers || 2–1 || Purkey (3–3) || Koufax || — || 24,263 || 11–26
|- bgcolor="ffbbbb"
| 38 || May 31 || Giants || 2–3 || Worthington || Face (2–4) || — || 13,070 || 11–27
|-

|- bgcolor="ffbbbb"
| 39 || June 1 || Giants || 2–3 || Worthington || Friend (3–5) || — || 5,301 || 11–28
|- bgcolor="ccffcc"
| 40 || June 2 || Giants || 3–2 || Kline (1–7) || Barclay || Arroyo (1) ||  || 12–28
|- bgcolor="ccffcc"
| 41 || June 2 || Giants || 2–0 || Purkey (4–3) || Burnside || — || 12,792 || 13–28
|- bgcolor="ccffcc"
| 42 || June 3 || Giants || 6–5 || King (1–0) || Margoneri || Face (3) || 7,504 || 14–28
|- bgcolor="ccffcc"
| 43 || June 4 || Cardinals || 5–4 || Arroyo (2–5) || Wilhelm || Face (4) || 12,178 || 15–28
|- bgcolor="ffbbbb"
| 44 || June 5 || Cardinals || 1–5 || McDaniel || Friend (3–6) || — || 12,570 || 15–29
|- bgcolor="ffbbbb"
| 45 || June 6 || Cardinals || 0–6 || Dickson || Kline (1–8) || — || 4,017 || 15–30
|- bgcolor="ffbbbb"
| 46 || June 7 || Braves || 0–5 || Spahn || Purkey (4–4) || — || 21,762 || 15–31
|- bgcolor="ffbbbb"
| 47 || June 9 || Braves || 1–2 (11) || Trowbridge || Friend (3–7) || Johnson ||  || 15–32
|- bgcolor="ccffcc"
| 48 || June 9 || Braves || 5–3 || Kline (2–8) || Pizarro || Face (5) || 21,888 || 16–32
|- bgcolor="ccffcc"
| 49 || June 10 || Redlegs || 5–2 || Law (3–2) || Nuxhall || — || 11,471 || 17–32
|- bgcolor="ccffcc"
| 50 || June 11 || Redlegs || 8–1 || Purkey (5–4) || Gross || — || 10,653 || 18–32
|- bgcolor="ccffcc"
| 51 || June 12 || Redlegs || 4–3 (10) || Face (3–4) || Acker || — || 14,920 || 19–32
|- bgcolor="ccffcc"
| 52 || June 13 || Redlegs || 3–2 || Friend (4–7) || Jeffcoat || — || 7,346 || 20–32
|- bgcolor="ffbbbb"
| 53 || June 14 || Cubs || 5–11 || Drott || Kline (2–9) || Elston || 17,088 || 20–33
|- bgcolor="ffbbbb"
| 54 || June 15 || Cubs || 1–5 || Drabowsky || Law (3–3) || — || 7,495 || 20–34
|- bgcolor="ffbbbb"
| 55 || June 16 || Cubs || 1–4 || Kaiser || Arroyo (2–6) || Lown ||  || 20–35
|- bgcolor="ccffcc"
| 56 || June 16 || Cubs || 5–4 || Law (4–3) || Brosnan || — || 18,525 || 21–35
|- bgcolor="ccffcc"
| 57 || June 17 || @ Braves || 7–5 || Purkey (6–4) || Jolly || Law (1) || 26,664 || 22–35
|- bgcolor="ccffcc"
| 58 || June 18 || @ Cardinals || 8–1 || Swanson (1–0) || Jackson || — || 17,694 || 23–35
|- bgcolor="ffbbbb"
| 59 || June 19 || @ Cardinals || 2–5 || Jones || Kline (2–10) || — ||  || 23–36
|- bgcolor="ffbbbb"
| 60 || June 19 || @ Cardinals || 1–5 || McDaniel || Purkey (6–5) || Wilhelm || 25,880 || 23–37
|- bgcolor="ffbbbb"
| 61 || June 20 || @ Cardinals || 4–7 || Dickson || Arroyo (2–7) || Merritt || 11,223 || 23–38
|- bgcolor="ccffcc"
| 62 || June 21 || @ Redlegs || 3–2 (11) || Purkey (7–5) || Jeffcoat || — || 19,648 || 24–38
|- bgcolor="ffbbbb"
| 63 || June 22 || @ Redlegs || 3–6 (11) || Lawrence || Purkey (7–6) || — || 9,299 || 24–39
|- bgcolor="ffbbbb"
| 64 || June 23 || @ Redlegs || 3–5 || Jeffcoat || Swanson (1–1) || — ||  || 24–40
|- bgcolor="ffbbbb"
| 65 || June 23 || @ Redlegs || 2–5 || Acker || Kline (2–11) || Sanchez || 22,188 || 24–41
|- bgcolor="ffbbbb"
| 66 || June 25 || @ Cubs || 3–5 || Hillman || Friend (4–8) || Lown || 5,002 || 24–42
|- bgcolor="ccffcc"
| 67 || June 26 || @ Cubs || 15–5 || Law (5–3) || Poholsky || — ||  || 25–42
|- bgcolor="ffffff"
| 68 || June 26 || @ Cubs || 5–5 (11) ||  ||  || — || 7,460 || 25–42
|- bgcolor="ccffcc"
| 69 || June 27 || @ Cubs || 5–4 (10) || King (2–0) || Lown || — || 4,900 || 26–42
|- bgcolor="ffbbbb"
| 70 || June 28 || @ Braves || 2–4 || Spahn || Friend (4–9) || — || 27,087 || 26–43
|- bgcolor="ffbbbb"
| 71 || June 29 || @ Braves || 6–13 || Pizarro || O'Brien (0–1) || — || 22,383 || 26–44
|- bgcolor="ffbbbb"
| 72 || June 30 || @ Braves || 4–7 || Johnson || Law (5–4) || — ||  || 26–45
|- bgcolor="ffbbbb"
| 73 || June 30 || @ Braves || 5–6 (13) || Jolly || Arroyo (2–8) || — || 36,283 || 26–46
|-

|- bgcolor="ffbbbb"
| 74 || July 1 || Phillies || 4–5 || Hearn || Smith (0–2) || Morehead || 14,680 || 26–47
|- bgcolor="ccffcc"
| 75 || July 4 || @ Dodgers || 5–1 || Friend (5–9) || Erskine || — ||  || 27–47
|- bgcolor="ffbbbb"
| 76 || July 4 || @ Dodgers || 2–8 || Newcombe || Purkey (7–7) || — || 20,664 || 27–48
|- bgcolor="ffbbbb"
| 77 || July 5 || @ Giants || 6–11 || Antonelli || Trimble (0–1) || Grissom || 4,998 || 27–49
|- bgcolor="ccffcc"
| 78 || July 6 || @ Giants || 3–2 (13) || Purkey (8–7) || Miller || — || 5,334 || 28–49
|- bgcolor="ccffcc"
| 79 || July 7 || @ Giants || 10–6 || Swanson (2–1) || Worthington || King (1) ||  || 29–49
|- bgcolor="ccffcc"
| 80 || July 7 || @ Giants || 8–1 || Friend (6–9) || Gomez || — || 10,825 || 30–49
|- bgcolor="ccffcc"
| 81 || July 10 || Braves || 5–2 || Purkey (9–7) || Buhl || — || 18,731 || 31–49
|- bgcolor="ffbbbb"
| 82 || July 11 || Braves || 2–7 || Trowbridge || Friend (6–10) || — || 17,278 || 31–50
|- bgcolor="ffbbbb"
| 83 || July 12 || Braves || 4–5 || Spahn || Face (3–5) || McMahon || 20,078 || 31–51
|- bgcolor="ffbbbb"
| 84 || July 13 || Braves || 3–4 || Burdette || Kline (2–12) || — || 9,330 || 31–52
|- bgcolor="ffbbbb"
| 85 || July 14 || Redlegs || 6–9 || Freeman || Friend (6–11) || — ||  || 31–53
|- bgcolor="ffbbbb"
| 86 || July 14 || Redlegs || 4–12 || Nuxhall || Trimble (0–2) || — || 24,540 || 31–54
|- bgcolor="ccffcc"
| 87 || July 16 || Cubs || 5–3 || Friend (7–11) || Rush || — || 11,300 || 32–54
|- bgcolor="ffbbbb"
| 88 || July 17 || Cubs || 3–4 || Drabowsky || Kline (2–13) || Littlefield || 8,534 || 32–55
|- bgcolor="ccffcc"
| 89 || July 18 || Cubs || 6–5 || Arroyo (3–8) || Lown || — || 3,877 || 33–55
|- bgcolor="ccffcc"
| 90 || July 19 || Cardinals || 7–0 || Law (6–4) || McDaniel || — || 25,774 || 34–55
|- bgcolor="ffbbbb"
| 91 || July 20 || Cardinals || 4–9 || Dickson || Friend (7–12) || Merritt || 9,230 || 34–56
|- bgcolor="ffbbbb"
| 92 || July 21 || Cardinals || 3–7 (10) || Schmidt || Arroyo (3–9) || Wilhelm ||  || 34–57
|- bgcolor="ffbbbb"
| 93 || July 21 || Cardinals || 2–11 || McDaniel || Purkey (9–8) || — || 20,280 || 34–58
|- bgcolor="ccffcc"
| 94 || July 23 || @ Redlegs || 6–3 (15) || Law (7–4) || Lawrence || Purkey (1) || 17,551 || 35–58
|- bgcolor="ffbbbb"
| 95 || July 24 || @ Redlegs || 0–2 || Nuxhall || Friend (7–13) || — || 11,961 || 35–59
|- bgcolor="ffbbbb"
| 96 || July 25 || @ Redlegs || 1–9 || Fowler || Kline (2–14) || — || 10,997 || 35–60
|- bgcolor="ffbbbb"
| 97 || July 26 || @ Cardinals || 3–4 (10) || Schmidt || Kline (2–15) || — || 15,352 || 35–61
|- bgcolor="ccffcc"
| 98 || July 27 || @ Cardinals || 4–2 || Purkey (10–8) || Dickson || — || 9,633 || 36–61
|- bgcolor="ffbbbb"
| 99 || July 28 || @ Cardinals || 0–4 || McDaniel || Law (7–5) || — ||  || 36–62
|- bgcolor="ffbbbb"
| 100 || July 28 || @ Cardinals || 8–9 (11) || Wilhelm || King (2–1) || — || 21,319 || 36–63
|- bgcolor="ffbbbb"
| 101 || July 29 || @ Cardinals || 0–4 || Mizell || Douglas (0–1) || — || 10,302 || 36–64
|- bgcolor="ffbbbb"
| 102 || July 30 || @ Braves || 2–5 || Burdette || Swanson (2–2) || — || 23,670 || 36–65
|- bgcolor="ffbbbb"
| 103 || July 31 || @ Braves || 2–4 || Buhl || Purkey (10–9) || — || 24,522 || 36–66
|-

|- bgcolor="ffbbbb"
| 104 || August 2 || @ Cubs || 4–6 || Hillman || Law (7–6) || — || 5,414 || 36–67
|- bgcolor="ffbbbb"
| 105 || August 4 || @ Cubs || 0–6 || Drabowsky || Friend (7–14) || — ||  || 36–68
|- bgcolor="ffbbbb"
| 106 || August 4 || @ Cubs || 2–3 (11) || Hillman || Arroyo (3–10) || — || 14,757 || 36–69
|- bgcolor="ccffcc"
| 107 || August 6 || Phillies || 5–3 || Kline (3–15) || Sanford || — || 11,136 || 37–69
|- bgcolor="ffbbbb"
| 108 || August 8 || Phillies || 3–6 || Simmons || Law (7–7) || Miller || 5,238 || 37–70
|- bgcolor="ffbbbb"
| 109 || August 9 || Dodgers || 2–4 || McDevitt || Friend (7–15) || Labine || 14,100 || 37–71
|- bgcolor="ffbbbb"
| 110 || August 10 || Dodgers || 0–3 || Drysdale || Purkey (10–10) || — || 7,751 || 37–72
|- bgcolor="ccffcc"
| 111 || August 11 || Dodgers || 4–3 (10) || Law (8–7) || Labine || — ||  || 38–72
|- bgcolor="ccffcc"
| 112 || August 11 || Dodgers || 6–2 || Douglas (1–1) || Craig || Face (6) || 18,350 || 39–72
|- bgcolor="ccffcc"
| 113 || August 13 || @ Phillies || 6–0 || Friend (8–15) || Hacker || — || 14,129 || 40–72
|- bgcolor="ccffcc"
| 114 || August 14 || @ Phillies || 10–3 || Law (9–7) || Simmons || — || 8,641 || 41–72
|- bgcolor="ffbbbb"
| 115 || August 16 || @ Dodgers || 1–4 || Podres || Purkey (10–11) || Roebuck || 9,592 || 41–73
|- bgcolor="ccffcc"
| 116 || August 17 || @ Dodgers || 7–3 || Kline (4–15) || Koufax || — || 6,830 || 42–73
|- bgcolor="ffbbbb"
| 117 || August 18 || @ Dodgers || 1–2 || Maglie || Friend (8–16) || — || 14,416 || 42–74
|- bgcolor="ccffcc"
| 118 || August 18 || @ Dodgers || 8–6 || Face (4–5) || Labine || Purkey (2) || 14,416 || 43–74
|- bgcolor="ffbbbb"
| 119 || August 20 || Braves || 1–3 || Spahn || Arroyo (3–11) || — || 21,328 || 43–75
|- bgcolor="ccffcc"
| 120 || August 22 || Redlegs || 8–3 || Friend (9–16) || Gross || — || 10,027 || 44–75
|- bgcolor="ffbbbb"
| 121 || August 23 || Redlegs || 0–6 || Nuxhall || Purkey (10–12) || — || 13,223 || 44–76
|- bgcolor="ccffcc"
| 122 || August 24 || Redlegs || 4–1 || Kline (5–15) || Lawrence || — || 7,037 || 45–76
|- bgcolor="ccffcc"
| 123 || August 25 || Cubs || 3–0 || Law (10–7) || Drabowsky || — ||  || 46–76
|- bgcolor="ffbbbb"
| 124 || August 25 || Cubs || 2–8 || Elston || Douglas (1–2) || Lown || 11,770 || 46–77
|- bgcolor="ccffcc"
| 125 || August 27 || Cardinals || 2–1 || Friend (10–16) || McDaniel || — || 12,845 || 47–77
|- bgcolor="ccffcc"
| 126 || August 28 || Cardinals || 2–0 || Kline (6–15) || Jackson || — || 10,367 || 48–77
|- bgcolor="ffbbbb"
| 127 || August 30 || @ Phillies || 3–4 || Sanford || Law (10–8) || — || 8,157 || 48–78
|- bgcolor="ffbbbb"
| 128 || August 31 || @ Phillies || 1–7 || Cardwell || Friend (10–17) || — || 5,141 || 48–79
|-

|- bgcolor="ffbbbb"
| 129 || September 1 || @ Phillies || 3–11 || Roberts || Purkey (10–13) || — ||  || 48–80
|- bgcolor="ccffcc"
| 130 || September 1 || @ Phillies || 6–3 || Douglas (2–2) || Simmons || Face (7) || 11,294 || 49–80
|- bgcolor="ffbbbb"
| 131 || September 2 || @ Giants || 5–11 || Monzant || Face (4–6) || — ||  || 49–81
|- bgcolor="ffbbbb"
| 132 || September 2 || @ Giants || 3–4 || Antonelli || O'Brien (0–2) || Grissom || 10,310 || 49–82
|- bgcolor="ffbbbb"
| 133 || September 3 || @ Giants || 5–6 (12) || Miller || Smith (0–3) || — ||  || 49–83
|- bgcolor="ccffcc"
| 134 || September 4 || Giants || 2–0 || Friend (11–17) || McCormick || — || 8,909 || 50–83
|- bgcolor="ccffcc"
| 135 || September 5 || Giants || 4–2 || Douglas (3–2) || Worthington || Face (8) || 5,189 || 51–83
|- bgcolor="ccffcc"
| 136 || September 6 || Phillies || 3–2 || Kline (7–15) || Haddix || — || 6,915 || 52–83
|- bgcolor="ccffcc"
| 137 || September 7 || Phillies || 6–3 || Swanson (3–2) || Sanford || Face (9) || 4,612 || 53–83
|- bgcolor="ffbbbb"
| 138 || September 8 || Phillies || 4–7 || Farrell || Purkey (10–14) || Roberts ||  || 53–84
|- bgcolor="ccffcc"
| 139 || September 8 || Phillies || 6–2 || Smith (1–3) || Hacker || — || 12,021 || 54–84
|- bgcolor="ffbbbb"
| 140 || September 10 || @ Braves || 3–4 || Burdette || Douglas (3–3) || — || 22,257 || 54–85
|- bgcolor="ccffcc"
| 141 || September 11 || @ Braves || 2–1 || Kline (8–15) || Spahn || — || 14,713 || 55–85
|- bgcolor="ccffcc"
| 142 || September 13 || @ Cubs || 4–1 || Friend (12–17) || Elston || — ||  || 56–85
|- bgcolor="ccffcc"
| 143 || September 13 || @ Cubs || 2–1 || Smith (2–3) || Drabowsky || Face (10) || 2,197 || 57–85
|- bgcolor="ccffcc"
| 144 || September 14 || @ Cubs || 3–1 || O'Brien (1–2) || Brosnan || — ||  || 58–85
|- bgcolor="ffbbbb"
| 145 || September 14 || @ Cubs || 3–7 || Brosnan || O'Brien (1–3) || Lown || 6,170 || 58–86
|- bgcolor="ffbbbb"
| 146 || September 15 || @ Cardinals || 6–9 || Wehmeier || Kline (8–16) || Muffett ||  || 58–87
|- bgcolor="ffbbbb"
| 147 || September 15 || @ Cardinals || 3–11 || Jones || Swanson (3–3) || Muffett || 24,577 || 58–88
|- bgcolor="ffbbbb"
| 148 || September 17 || @ Redlegs || 5–9 || Nuxhall || Friend (12–18) || Kennedy || 3,676 || 58–89
|- bgcolor="ffbbbb"
| 149 || September 18 || @ Redlegs || 1–2 || Lawrence || Smith (2–4) || — || 3,607 || 58–90
|- bgcolor="ccffcc"
| 150 || September 21 || Giants || 5–4 || Purkey (11–14) || Worthington || — ||  || 59–90
|- bgcolor="ffbbbb"
| 151 || September 21 || Giants || 5–9 || Gomez || Witt (0–1) || Grissom || 8,110 || 59–91
|- bgcolor="ccffcc"
| 152 || September 22 || Giants || 5–1 || Friend (13–18) || Monzant || — || 19,574 || 60–91
|- bgcolor="ffbbbb"
| 153 || September 24 || @ Dodgers || 0–2 || McDevitt || Daniels (0–1) || — || 6,702 || 60–92
|- bgcolor="ccffcc"
| 154 || September 28 || @ Giants || 1–0 || Kline (9–16) || Gomez || — ||  || 61–92
|- bgcolor="ccffcc"
| 155 || September 29 || @ Giants || 9–1 || Friend (14–18) || Antonelli || — || 11,606 || 62–92
|-

|-
| Legend:       = Win       = Loss       = TieBold = Pirates team member

Opening Day lineup

Notable transactions 
 May 1, 1957: Dale Long and Lee Walls were traded by the Pirates to the Chicago Cubs for Dee Fondy and Gene Baker.
 May 14, 1957: Bob Smith was purchased by the Pirates from the St. Louis Cardinals.

Roster

Player stats

Batting

Starters by position 
Note: Pos = Position; G = Games played; AB = At bats; H = Hits; Avg. = Batting average; HR = Home runs; RBI = Runs batted in

Other batters 
Note: G = Games played; AB = At bats; H = Hits; Avg. = Batting average; HR = Home runs; RBI = Runs batted in

Pitching

Starting pitchers 
Note: G = Games pitched; IP = Innings pitched; W = Wins; L = Losses; ERA = Earned run average; SO = Strikeouts

Other pitchers 
Note: G = Games pitched; IP = Innings pitched; W = Wins; L = Losses; ERA = Earned run average; SO = Strikeouts

Relief pitchers 
Note: G = Games pitched; W = Wins; L = Losses; SV = Saves; ERA = Earned run average; SO = Strikeouts

Farm system

LEAGUE CHAMPIONS: LincolnJamestown club folded, June 25, 1957

Notes

References 
 1957 Pittsburgh Pirates at Baseball Reference
 1957 Pittsburgh Pirates at Baseball Almanac

Pittsburgh Pirates seasons
Pittsburgh Pirates season
Pittsburgh Pirates